Chaley Rose is an American actress and singer. She is best known for her role as Zoey in the ABC drama series Nashville.

Personal life 
Chaley Rose Jackson was born and raised in the city of Columbus, Indiana. She attended Central Middle School and Columbus East High School where she was a cheerleader, gymnast, and on the track team. She was the school's first Black homecoming queen. After high school, she graduated from Indiana University. She then spent time studying acting in New York City before moving to Los Angeles.  Chaley Rose's parents are Cheryl Owsley Jackson, a reporter, and Charles (Chuck) Jackson, an artist. They were married for more than 20 years, now divorced. She has one sibling, a brother, Charles E. Jackson, Jr. (Chase).

Filmography

Discography

Soundtracks
The Music of Nashville: Season 2, Volume 1 (2013)
 Contributed 2 tracks: "Wayfaring Stranger" and "Come See About Me" with Clare Bowen
The Music of Nashville: Season 2, Volume 2 (2014)
 Contributed 3 tracks: "I Ain't Leavin' Without Your Love" with Sam Palladio and Jonathan Jackson, "Hennessee" with Sam Palladio and Jonathan Jackson and "Carry You Home"
Christmas with Nashville (2014)
 Contributed 2 tracks: "Have Yourself A Merry Little Christmas" and "Celebrate Me Home" with the Nashville cast
The Music of Nashville: Season 3, Volume 1 (2014)
 Contributed 1 track: "The Most Beautiful Girl In The World" with Sam Palladio and Jonathan Jackson
The Music of Nashville: Season 4, Volume 1 (2015)
 Contributed 1 track: "Take My Hand, Precious Lord"

References

External links

 

Living people
American women country singers
American film actresses
American television actresses
Year of birth missing (living people)
21st-century American actresses
21st-century American singers
21st-century American women singers